Albert Henry "Abe" McDougall (30 November 1876 – 9 March 1948) was an Australian rules footballer who played for the Fitzroy Football Club in the Victorian Football League (VFL).

McDougall commenced his football career with St Mary's in the Metropolitan Junior Football League in 1895 and made some appearances for North Melbourne in the Victorian Football Association before being cleared to Fitzroy in 1898.

McDougall was the match winner in his debut VFL game against Carlton, kicking two goals in a low-scoring affair. He played as a forward pocket in the Fitzroy premiership teams of 1898 and 1899. In 1900 he appeared in his third successive grand final, as a centre half-forward, but finished on the losing side.

A coppersmith by trade, McDougall later served in World War I as a mechanic for the 1st Australian Flying Corps.

McDougall's son, Roy McDougall, also played for Fitzroy.

References

External links

1876 births
1948 deaths
VFL/AFL players born outside Australia
Australian rules footballers from Melbourne
Australian Rules footballers: place kick exponents
Fitzroy Football Club players
Fitzroy Football Club Premiership players
North Melbourne Football Club (VFA) players
Australian military personnel of World War I
Two-time VFL/AFL Premiership players
New Zealand players of Australian rules football
New Zealand emigrants to Australia
People from Port Melbourne
Military personnel from Melbourne
Sportspeople from Auckland